These are the results of the men's artistic team all-around competition, one of six events for male competitors of the artistic gymnastics discipline contested in the gymnastics at the 1992 Summer Olympics in Barcelona.

Results

Final

References

https://web.archive.org/web/20101007212605/http://gymnasticsresults.com/o1992m.html#tm

Men's artistic team all-around
Men's events at the 1992 Summer Olympics